KHDZ-LP is a low power radio station broadcasting out of Porterville, California.

History
KHDZ-LP went on the air on February 12, 2014.

References

External links
 

Porterville, California
Radio stations established in 2015
HDZ-LP
2015 establishments in California
HDZ-LP